Mats Christer Lilienberg (born 22 December 1969) is a Swedish former professional footballer who played as a striker. He won three Allsvenskan titles and was the Allsvenskan top scorer twice during a professional career that spanned between 1990 and 2004. A full international between 1993 and 1998, he won five caps for the Sweden national team and scored one goal.

Club career 
Lilienberg represented Trelleborgs FF, 1860 Munich, IFK Göteborg, Halmstads BK, Malmö FF, and Höörs IS during his career. He won three Allsvenskan titles (in 1995, 1996, and 1997) and was the Allsvenskan top scorer in 1993 and 1997 with 18 and 14 goals respectively. While at Malmö FF, he played at forward alongside a young Zlatan Ibrahimovic.

International career 
After having represented the Sweden U21 team a total of three times, Lilienberg made his full international debut for Sweden on 10 November 1993 in a 1994 FIFA World Cup qualifier against Austria when he replaced Henrik Larsson in the 72nd minute of a 1–1 draw. He scored his first and only international goal for Sweden in a friendly 3–1 win against the United States on 20 February 1994. He won his fifth and final cap on 29 January 1998 in a friendly 0–0 draw with Jamaica.

Career statistics

International

Honours
IFK Göteborg

 Allsvenskan: 1995, 1996

Halmstads BK

 Allsvenskan: 1997
Individual
 Allsvenskan top scorer: 1993 (18 goals), 1997 (14 goals)

References

External links
 
 

Living people
1969 births
People from Sjöbo Municipality
Association football forwards
Swedish footballers
Sweden international footballers
Swedish expatriate footballers
Allsvenskan players
Superettan players
Bundesliga players
2. Bundesliga players
Trelleborgs FF players
TSV 1860 Munich players
IFK Göteborg players
Halmstads BK players
Malmö FF players
Footballers from Skåne County